Diontae Lamarcus Johnson (born July 5, 1996) is an American football wide receiver for the Pittsburgh Steelers of the National Football League (NFL). He played college football at Toledo and was drafted by the Steelers in the third round of the 2019 NFL Draft.

Early years
Johnson attended and played high school football at Earl J. Lennard High School.

College career
Johnson played college football for Toledo from 2015 to 2018. During his time at Toledo, he had 135 catches for 2,235 yards and 23 touchdowns.  He also had four rushing attempts for 26 yards.  His sophomore year was his best, where he had 74 catches for 1,278 yards and 13 touchdowns.

Collegiate statistics

Professional career

2019
Johnson was drafted by the Pittsburgh Steelers in the third round, 66th overall, of the 2019 NFL Draft. The Steelers originally acquired the selection in a trade that sent Antonio Brown to the Oakland Raiders. Johnson made his NFL debut in Week 1 against the New England Patriots.  In the game, Johnson made three catches for 25 yards in the 33–3 loss. In Week 3 against the San Francisco 49ers, Johnson caught three passes for 52 yards and his first career touchdown as the Steelers lost 24–20. In Week 8 against the Miami Dolphins, Johnson caught five passes for a career-high 84 yards, including a 45-yard touchdown, in the 27–14 win.  In Week 11 against the Cleveland Browns on Thursday Night Football, Johnson was concussed after safety Damarious Randall made a helmet to helmet hit on him. In Week 14 against the Arizona Cardinals, Johnson caught six passes for 60 yards and a touchdown and returned a punt for an 85-yard touchdown in the 23–17 win, earning him AFC Special Teams Player of the Week. On January 3, 2020, Johnson was named to the NFL All-Pro Second-team as a punt return specialist. Overall, Johnson finished the 2019 season with 59 receptions for 680 receiving yards and five receiving touchdowns.

2020
Johnson finished the 2020 season with 88 receptions for 923 receiving yards and seven receiving touchdowns in 15 games. He had two games going over the 100-yard mark on the season.

In the Wild Card Round of the playoffs against the Cleveland Browns, Johnson recorded 11 catches for 117 yards during the 48–37 loss.

2021 
Johnson finished the 2021 season with 107 receptions for 1,161 receiving yards and eight receiving touchdowns in 16 games. He had three games going over the 100-yard mark on the season.

In the Wild Card Round of the playoffs against the Kansas City Chiefs, Johnson caught five passes totaling 34 yards and a touchdown in the 42–21 loss.

After the AFC Championship game which resulted in the Cincinnati Bengals making it to Super Bowl LVI, he was named to his first Pro Bowl, replacing Bengals receiver Ja'Marr Chase.

2022 
On August 4, 2022, Johnson signed a two-year, $36.71 million contract extension with the Steelers that included $27 million guaranteed.

In Week 15 against the Carolina Panthers, Johnson had his best game of the season with 10 receptions for 98 yards, both season highs. He finished the 2022 season with a team-high 86 receptions for 882 yards and zero touchdowns, setting an NFL record for most receptions in a season without a touchdown.

NFL statistics

Regular season

Postseason

References

External links

Pittsburgh Steelers bio
Toledo Rockets bio

1996 births
Living people
American Conference Pro Bowl players
American football wide receivers
People from Ruskin, Florida
Pittsburgh Steelers players
Players of American football from Florida
Sportspeople from Hillsborough County, Florida
Toledo Rockets football players